Prof Lindiwe Sibanda Majele Director and Chair: ARUA Centre of Excellence in Sustainable Food Systems (ARUA-SFS) University of Pretoria South Africa

Life 
Prof Lindiwe Majele Sibanda is a food systems scientist, policy advocate and trusted key influencer on food systems. She has over 25 years of trans-disciplinary work experience in agriculture and rural development, public and private sector policy reforms and management, 15 of them having been at senior level in the academic, scientific, private and public institutions. She is a renowned preeminent technical leader and diplomat. Globally, Prof Lindiwe Majele Sibanda is a recognized leader and has served as trustee and adviser to numerous international food security related initiatives. She is a serving member of the SDG Target by 2030 Champions 12.3, co-Chair of the Global Alliance of Climate-Smart Agriculture, member of the World Vegetable Board, and a commissioner for the EAT-Lancet report on Sustainable Healthy Food Systems. Previously, she has served as a member of the United Nations (UN) Committee for Policy Development (CDP), and the African Union Commission (AUC) Leadership Council; university professor in agriculture, animal sciences and veterinary sciences and is a regular guest lecturer at several universities. She is a recipient of numerous awards for her contribution towards agriculture and food security in Africa; including the, Science Diplomacy Award by the Government of South Africa (2015); FARA Award for Exemplary leadership (2014); and Yara 2013 Prize Laureate; (2013). She holds a BSc Degree Animal Production First Class Honours from the University of Alexandria in Egypt and MSc and PhD, University of Reading, UK. She is currently Director and Chairwoman, African Research Universities Alliance Centre of Excellence in Sustainable Food Systems (ARUA-SFS).

Career Highlights 
 Prof Sibanda led the climate change global campaign on No Agriculture, No Deal in the UN Framework for Climate Change Convention (UNFCCC) meeting in Copenhagen
 She served as trustee and program advisor to 5 CGIAR global research entities cumulative 21years of service to Global food systems research
 Co-chair of Global Alliance for Climate Smart Agriculture (GACSA) hosted by the UN-FAO 
 Currently serving as one of the Presidential Advisory Council members on Agriculture in Zimbabwe
 Appointment as Professor, Director and Chair of the African Research Universities Alliance (ARUA) Centre of Excellence in Food Security, hosted by the University of Pretoria
 Served as the African representative in cutting edge global engagements that include, Lancet report on Healthy diets from sustainable food systems, the Cornell Atkinson Center for Sustainability/Nature Sustainability Expert Panel report and the 2020 Curt Bergfors Food Planet Prize
 Chaired Board of Trustees of the International Livestock Research Institute as youngest ever, first time ever African Chair
 Nominated to serve as a member of the Board of Directors for Nestle, a leading food and beverage company
 Served as a member of the Chicago Council on Global Affairs an independent, nonpartisan organization that provides insight on critical global issues, advances policy solutions, and fosters dialogue about what is happening in the world
 Trustee for Deputy Chair of Trust I-am-for-Bulawayo (Iam4Byo) – FightingCovid19 http://www.iam4byo.org.zw/

Career Focus Areas 
 Focusing on livestock sciences  
 Climate smart agriculture  
 Sustainable food systems 
 Food and nutrition for health  
 Water lands and ecosystems 
 Women and youth  
 Research and policy advocacy  
 Farming  
 Food policy markets and institutions 
 Focusing on wheat and maize  
 Multi-stakeholder engagement (Community, Governments, NGOs, Private Sector & Research Community)
 Co-function analysis and change management for government and private sector 
 Sustainable development goals
 Food loss and waste

Education 
1992	-	PhD. Agriculture/Animal Physiology

1988	-	University of Reading, UK 1988, M. Sc Agriculture/Grassland Science

1986	-	University of Alexandria, Egypt 1986 B. Sc. Agriculture

Awards 
 Science Diplomacy Award by the Government of South Africa (2015); https://www.fanrpan.org/archive/documents/d01934/
 Forum for FARA Award for Exemplary leadership (2014); https://www.weforum.org/people/lindiwe-majele-sibanda
 Yara 2013 Prize Laureate; (2013) https://www.weforum.org/people/lindiwe-majele-sibanda
 Food Tank recognition as one of the women working to change the food system in honor of International Women’s day, https://champions123.org/person/lindiwemajele-sibanda
 Nominated as Global citizen (2012) Nominated as Global citizen https://www.fanrpan.org/archive/documents/d01426/

Mandates 
 CGIAR System Board as a voting Board Member 3 year term (2021)
 Nestle Board of Directors (2021)
 Advisory Board Member of Infinite Foods.
 AGRA VP for Country Support, Policy and Delivery (2017)

Mandates: Not for profit 
 World Vegetable Centre Board of Directors https://avrdc.org/new-members-appointed-in-2018-to-worldvegetable-center-board-of-directors/
 ILRI board chair (2012) https://newsarchive.ilri.org/index.php/archives/9996
 Board  member and Chair of the nominations committee, World Vegetable Board.  
 Serving member, Champions UN-SDG 12.3, accelerating progress toward reducing food loss and waste towards achieving SDG Target 12.3 by 2030. 
 Co-Chair, UN-Global Alliance for Climate Smart Agriculture (GACSA). 
 Presidential advisory council member on Agriculture in Zimbabwe. 
 Deputy Chair of Council for the National University of Science and Technology (NUST). 
 Presidential advisory council member.  She is currently serving as one of the presidential advisory council members on Agriculture in Zimbabwe 
 International Advisory Panel Member, Regional Universities Forum for Capacity Building in Agriculture (RUFORUM). 
 2020 Food Planet Prize: Jury Member 
 Cornell University–Nature Sustainability expert panel on “Innovations to build sustainable, equitable, inclusive food value chains”, through Cornell Atkinson Center for Sustainability’s  food security working group, with the journal Nature Sustainability and its sister journal, Nature Food. 
 Advisory board member of the ARUA UKRI GCRF- Partnership Programme for Capacity building in Food Security for Africa (CaBFoodS-Africa) hosted by the University of Pretoria, in collaboration with the University of Nairobi, and the University of Ghana, Legon. 
 Deputy Chairperson of the Iam4Byo Fighting Covid-19 Trust responsible for communications, public relations and research coalition.

Publications 
 2020. Socio-technical Innovation Bundles for Agri-food Systems Transformation, Report of the International Expert Panel on Innovations to Build Sustainable, Equitable, Inclusive Food Value Chains. Barrett, Christopher B., Tim Benton, Jessica Fanzo, Mario Herrero, Rebecca J. Nelson, Elizabeth Bageant, Edward Buckler, Karen Cooper, Isabella Culotta, Shenggen Fan, Rikin Gandhi, Steven James, Mark Kahn, Laté Lawson-Lartego, Jiali Liu, Quinn Marshall, Daniel Mason-D’Croz, Alexander Mathys, Cynthia Mathys, Veronica Mazariegos-Anastassiou, Alesha (Black) Miller, Kamakhya Misra, Andrew G. Mude, Jianbo Shen, Lindiwe Majele Sibanda, Claire Song, Roy Steiner, Philip Thornton, and Stephen Wood. Ithaca, NY, and London: Cornell Atkinson Center for Sustainability and Springer Nature, 2020
 2020. Men’s nutrition knowledge is important for women’s and children’s nutrition in Ethiopia. Ambikapathi R, Passarelli S, Madzorera I, et al. Matern Child Nutr. 2021;17e13062.
 2020. A Chicken Production Intervention and Additional Nutrition Behavior Change Component Increased Child Growth in Ethiopia: A Cluster-Randomized Trial Simone Passarelli,  Ramya Ambikapathi,  Nilupa S Gunaratna,  Isabel Madzorera, Chelsey R Canavan,  Abdallah R Noor,  Amare Worku,  Yemane Berhane,  Semira Abdelmenan, Simbarashe Sibanda,  Bertha Munthali,  Tshilidzi Madzivhandila,  Lindiwe M Sibanda, Kumlachew Geremew,  Tadelle Dessie,  Solomon Abegaz,  Getnet Assefa,  Christopher Sudfeld, Margaret McConnell,  Kirsten Davison,  Wafaie Fawzi The Journal of Nutrition, nxaa181. 
 2018 EAT Lancet report with Johan Rockström and Walter Willett. Healthy diets from sustainable food systems. Food in the Anthropocene. Willett W, Rockström J, Loken B, Springmann M, Lang T, Vermeulen S, Garnett T, Tilman D, DeClerck F, Wood A, Jonell M, Clark M, Gordon LJ, Fanzo J, Hawkes C, Zurayk R, Rivera JA, De Vries W, Majele Sibanda L, Afshin A, Chaudhary A, Herrero M, Agustina R, Branca F, Lartey A, Fan S, Crona B, Fox E, Bignet V, Troell M, Lindahl T, Singh S, Cornell SE, Srinath Reddy K, Narain S, Nishtar S, Murray CJL. Lancet. PMID 30660336.
 2018. Sustainable and Equitable Increases in Fruit and Vegetable Productivity and Consumption are Needed to Achieve Global Nutrition Security. Position Paper resulting from a workshop organized by the Aspen Global Change Institute and hosted at the Keystone Policy Center July 30 – August 3, 2018 https://www.agci.org/sites/default/files/pdfs/lib/publications/AGCI-FV-Position-Paper.pdf 
 Sibanda, L. M and Mwamakamba, S.N. (2016) Africa’s Rainbow Revolution: Feeding a Continent and the World in a Changing Climate. Solutions, May–June 2016 in press. https://thesolutionsjournal.com/2016/06/17/africas-rainbow-revolution-feeding-continent-world-changing-climate/
 Johan Rockstro ̈m, John Williams, Gretchen Daily, Andrew Noble, Nathanial Matthews, Line Gordon, Hanna Wetterstrand, Fabrice DeClerck, Mihir Shah, Pasquale Steduto, Charlotte de Fraiture, Nuhu Hatibu, Olcay Unver, Jeremy Bird, Lindiwe Sibanda, Jimmy Smith. 2016 .Sustainable intensification of agriculture for human prosperity and global sustainability.  Springerlink.com 
 Editor in Chief for FANRPAN’s AgriDeal Magazine (2015). Climate Smart Agriculture (CSA). Vol 3, ISSN 2304-8824 
 Douglas J. Merrey and Lindiwe Sibanda. 2014. Options for Policy Reforms to Enhance the Development Impact of Public and Private Investments in Smallholder Agricultural Water Management. FANRPAN
 Zinyengere N., Crespo O., Hachigonta S. Sibanda L. (2013). Climate Change Adaptation in Southern Africa: Linking science studies and policy decisions to drive evidence-based action. FANRPAN Policy Brief Issue 1 Volume XIII February 2013. 
 Hachigonta, S; Nelson, G.C; Thomas, T.S; Sibanda, L.M (2013) Southern African Agriculture and Climate Change, A comprehensive analysis. Published by International Food Policy Research Institute. ISBN 978-0-89629-208-6 
 Hachigonta, Sepo; Nelson, Gerald C.; Thomas, Timothy S. and Sibanda, Lindiwe M. 2013. Overview. In Southern African Agriculture and Climate Change: A comprehensive analysis. Chapter 1 pp. 1–23. Washington, D.C.: International Food Policy Research Institute (IFPRI). http://ebrary.ifpri.org/cdm/ref/collection/p15738coll2/id/127787
 Mugabe, Francis T.; Thomas, Timothy S.; Hachigonta, Sepo and Sibanda, Lindiwe M. 2013. Zimbabwe. In Southern African Agriculture and Climate Change: A comprehensive analysis. Chapter 10 pp. 289–323. Washington, D.C.: International Food Policy Research Institute (IFPRI) http://ebrary.ifpri.org/cdm/ref/collection/p15738coll2/id/127792
 Manyatsi, Absalom M.; Thomas, Timothy S.; Masarirambi, Michael T.; Hachigonta, Sepo and Sibanda, Lindiwe M. 2013. Swaziland. In Southern African Agriculture and Climate Change: A comprehensive analysis. Chapter 8 pp. 213–253. Washington, D.C.: International Food Policy Research Institute (IFPRI) http://ebrary.ifpri.org/cdm/ref/collection/p15738coll2/id/127793
 Johnston, Peter; Thomas, Timothy S.; Hachigonta, Sepo and Sibanda, Lindiwe M. 2013. South Africa. In Southern African Agriculture and Climate Change: A comprehensive analysis. Chapter 7 pp. 175–212. Washington, D.C.: International Food Policy Research Institute (IFPRI). http://ebrary.ifpri.org/cdm/ref/collection/p15738coll2/id/127786
 Maure, Genito A.; Thomas, Timothy S.; Hachigonta, Sepo and Sibanda, Lindiwe M. 2013. Mozambique. In Southern African Agriculture and Climate Change: A comprehensive analysis. Chapter 6 pp. 147–173. Washington, D.C.: International Food Policy Research Institute (IFPRI). http://ebrary.ifpri.org/cdm/ref/collection/p15738coll2/id/127789
 Kanyanga, Joseph; Thomas, Timothy S.; Hachigonta, Sepo and Sibanda, Lindiwe M. 2013. Zambia. In Southern African Agriculture and Climate Change: A comprehensive analysis. Chapter 9 pp. 255–287. Washington, D.C.: International Food Policy Research Institute (IFPRI). http://ebrary.ifpri.org/cdm/ref/collection/p15738coll2/id/127790
 Saka, John D.K.; Sibale, Pickford; Thomas, Timothy S.; Hachigonta, Sepo and Sibanda, Lindiwe M. 2013. Malawi. In Southern African Agriculture and Climate Change: A comprehensive analysis. Chapter 5 pp. 111–146. Washington, D.C.: International Food Policy Research Institute (IFPRI) http://ebrary.ifpri.org/cdm/ref/collection/p15738coll2/id/127791
 Gwimbi, Patrick; Thomas, Timothy S.; Hachigonta, Sepo and Sibanda, Lindiwe M. 2013. Lesotho. In Southern African Agriculture and Climate Change: A comprehensive analysis. Chapter 4 pp. 71–109. Washington, D.C.: International Food Policy Research Institute (IFPRI). http://ebrary.ifpri.org/cdm/ref/collection/p15738coll2/id/127788
 Zhou, Peter P.; Simbini, Tichakunda; Ramokgotlwane, Gorata; Thomas, Timothy S.; Hachigonta, Sepo and Sibanda, Lindiwe M. 2013. Botswana. In Southern African Agriculture and Climate Change: A comprehensive analysis. Chapter 3 pp. 41–70. Washington, D.C.: International Food Policy Research Institute (IFPRI). http://ebrary.ifpri.org/cdm/ref/collection/p15738coll2/id/127785
 Editor in Chief for FANRPAN’s AgriDeal Magazine (2013). The River between. Vol 2, ISSN 2304-8824 
 Zinyengere, N Crespo, O, Hachigonta, S and Sibanda, L.M (2013). Climate Change Adaptation in Southern Africa: Linking science studies and policy decisions to drive evidence-based action. FANRPAN Policy Brief, Issue no. 1: Volume XIII 
 Sullivan A, Mumba A, Hachigonta,S Connolly, M and Sibanda L.M (2013). Appropriate Climate Smart Technologies for Smallholder Farmers in Sub-Saharan Africa. FANRPAN Policy Brief, Issue no. 2: Volume XIIIEditor in chief for FANRPAN’s Agri Deal Magazine (2012). Women Warming Africa Vol 1, ISSN 2304-8824 
 Sullivan, A, Mwamakamba, S, Mumba A, Hachigonta S and Sibanda L.M (2012). Climate Smart Agriculture: More Than Technologies Are Needed to Move Smallholder Farmers toward Resilient and Sustainable Livelihoods. FANRPAN Policy Brief Issue no. 2: Volume XIII 
 Sullivan, A. and SIBANDA, L.M (2010). Vulnerable Populations, Unreliable Water and Low Water Productivity: A Role for Institutions in the Limpopo Basin. Published in: Water International, Vol. 35, Issue 5 September 2010, pages 545 - 572 
 SIBANDA, L.M and Ndema, S. (2008). The Global Food Crisis: Who are the Architects of our Livelihoods? FANRPAN Policy Brief Series 01/8 August 2008. 
 SIBANDA, L.M (2008). African Think Tanks and Policy Dialogues: Time to Start Talking Again. In: Global Future: The global food price crisis: ensuring food security for all. No. 3, 2008. A World Vision Journal of Human Development. 
 SIBANDA, L.M (2007). Food Agriculture and Policy Analysis Network (FANRPAN) and its Evolving Partnership with the CGIAR. Alignment and Collective Action Updates. A quarterly newsletter on the CGIAR’s institutional and partnership innovations for greater impact in eastern and southern Africa. August 2007, Vol. 1:3 pg 2 
 SIBANDA, L.M, Kalibwani, F and Kureya, T. (2006). Silent Hunger: Policy Options for Effective Response to the Impact of HIV and AIDS on Agriculture and Food Security in the SADC Region. FANRPAN, 2006. 
 MERREY D.J and SIBANDA, L.M (2006). From Rain fed Poverty to Irrigated Prosperity: Expanding Micro-Agricultural Water Management in Sub-Saharan Africa. 
 SIBANDA, L. M., BRYANT, M. J. and NDLOVU, L. R. (2000). Live weight and Body Condition Score Changes of Female Matebele Goats During their Breeding Cycle in a Semi- Arid Environment under Traditional Management. Small Ruminant Research, 35: 271 – 275. 
 SIBANDA, L. M., NDLOVU, L. R. and BRYANT, M. J. (1999). Effects of a Low Plane of Nutrition during Pregnancy and Lactation on the Performance of MatebeleDoes and their kids. Small Ruminant Research, 32: 234-250. 
 SIBANDA, L.M., SIMELA, L. (1997). Carcass characteristics of the marketed Matebele goat from south-western Zimbabwe. DOI: 10.1016/S0921-4488(98)00182-5
 SIBANDA, L.M., BRYANT, M.J., NDLOVU, L.R. (1997). Factors Affecting the Growth and Survival of Goat Kids in a Semi-Arid Environment under Smallholder Management. Journal of Applied Science in Southern Africa, 3: 27-33. 
 SIBANDA, L.M., NDLOVU, L.R., BRYANT, M. J. (1997). Reproductive Performance of Matebele Goats in a Semi-Arid Environment under Smallholder Management. Journal of Applied Science in Southern Africa, 3: 35-42. 
 SIBANDA, L.M., NDLOVU, L.R. and BRYANT, M.J. (1997). Effects of Feeding Varying Amounts of a Grain-Forage Diet during Late Pregnancy and Lactation on the Performance of Matebele Goats. Journal of Agricultural Science (Cambridge), 128: 469-477. 
 SIBANDA, L.M., SIMELA, L. (1997). Milk production, processing and marketing to improve the nutrition and income generating capacity of rural households in Zimbabwe
 NDLOVU, L.R. and SIBANDA, L.M. (1996). The Potential of Dolichos Lablab and Acacia tortilis Pods in Smallholder Feeding Systems for Goat Kids in Semi-Arid Areas of Southern Africa. Small Ruminant Research, 21:273-276. 
 SIBANDA, L.M, NDLOVU L. R., BRYANT M. J. (1997). Factors Affecting the Growth and Survival of MatebeleGoat Kids in a Semi-Arid Environment under Smallholder Management. In: Journal of Applied Science in Southern Africa, Vol. 3, Nos. 1 & 2. 
 NDLOVU, L. R., SIBANDA, H.M., SIBANDA, L.M. and HOVE, E. (1995). Nutritive Value of Indigenous BrowsableTree Species in a Semi-Arid Area of Zimbabwe. IVthInternationalSymposium on the Nutrition of Herbivores. Clermont-Ferrand, France, 11–15 September 1995. 
 SIBANDA, L.M., BRYANT, M.J. and NDLOVU, L.R. (1993). Litter Size in the Matebele Goat and its Effect on Productivity. Animal Production, 56:440. 
 NDLOVU, L.R. and SIBANDA, L.M. (1993). Management Strategies for Minimizing Environmental Constraints to Small ruminant Production in Semi-Arid Areas of Southern Africa. In: Animal Production in Developing Countries. (Gill, M., Owen, E., Pollott, G.E. and Lawrence, T.L.J., Editors). British Society of Animal Production, Occasional Publication No. 16 pp 178. 
 SIBANDA, L.M., BRYANT, M.J. and NDLOVU, L.R. (1993). The Effect of Kidding Season on Productivity of Indigenous Matebele Goats of Zimbabwe. In: Animal Production in Developing Countries. (Gill, M., Owen, E., Pollott, G.E. and Lawrence, T.L.J. Editors). British Society of Animal Production Occasional Publication No. 16 pp 184–185. 
 NDLOVU, L. R. and SIBANDA, L.M. (1993). Improving the Productivity of Indigenous Goats in Zimbabwe. In: Improving Productivity of Indigenous Livestock using Radioimmunoassay (RIA) and other Techniques. International Atomic Energy Agency, Vienna, Austria. pp 177–189. 
 NDLOVU, L. R. and SIBANDA, L.M. (1993). Management Strategies for Minimizing Environmental Constraints to Small Ruminant Production in Semi-Arid Areas of Southern Africa. In: Animal Production in Developing Countries. Occasional Publication No. 16. (M. Gill, E. Owen, G.E. Pollot and T.L.J. Lawrence eds.) British Society of Animal Production. pp 178. 
 SIBANDA, L.M., BRYANT, M.J. and NDLOVU, L.R. (1992). Responses of Matebele Goats of Zimbabwe to Feeding Level: Lactation. Animal Production 54 (3) 472. 
 SIBANDA, L.M., NDLOVU, L. R. and BRYANT, M.J. (1992). Experiences in Adapting Previously Free-Ranging Traditionally Managed Matebele Goats of Zimbabwe to Individual Stall Feeding. In: Small Ruminant Research and Development in Africa (Rey, B., Lebbie, S.H. and Reynolds, L. eds) pp 345–354. ILCA, Addis Ababa, Ethiopia. 
 NDLOVU, L. R. and SIBANDA, L.M. (1991). Management Strategies for Minimizing Environmental Constraints to Small Ruminant Production in Semi-Arid Areas of Southern Africa. British Society of Animal Production Occasional Meeting, Kent, 2–4 September 1991. 
 SIBANDA, L.M. and NDLOVU, L. R. (1991). Productivity of Indigenous Matebele Goats of Zimbabwe under Traditional Management. British Society of Animal Production Occasional Meeting, Kent, 2–4 September 1991. 
 NDLOVU, L. R. and SIBANDA, L.M. (1991). Improving the Nutritional Status of Smallholder Livestock in Agro-Silvicultural Systems in Semi-Arid Southern Africa. In: Isotopes and Related Techniques in Animal Production and Health. International Atomic Agency, Vienna, pp 201–209. 
 SIBANDA, L.M., NDLOVU, L. R. and BRYANT, M.J. (1992). Veld Hay and Lucerne as Feed for Indigenous Matebele Does Kidding During the Dry Season. In: Complementarity of feed resources in African livestock production. (Stares, J.E.S., Said, A.N. and Kategile, J.A. eds). ILCA, Addis Ababa, Ethiopia, pp 205–214.

Media 
 OXFAM: Bringing African voices to the table around global hunger and food security (2016), https://www.oxfamamerica.org/explore/stories/bringing-africanvoices-to-the-table-around-global-hunger-food-security/
 Sibanda, L.M. Women Farmers – the Cornerstone of African Agriculture (2016)  http://www.fanrpan.org/documents/d01950/ 
 Bringing African voices to the table around global hunger & food security (2016)  
 http://www.oxfamamerica.org/explore/stories/bringing-african-voices-to-the-table-around- global-hunger-food-security/ 
 Sibanda, L.M. The alternate future of African farming. (2014).  
 https://www.devex.com/news/the-alternate-future-of-african-farming-84615 
 Sibanda, L.M. Closing Africa’s agricultural yield gap. (2014)  
 http://www.thisisafricaonline.com/News/Closing-Africa-s-agricultural-yield-gap 
 Sibanda, L.M. African smallholder farm families have lost the elasticity to bounce back! (2014)  
 http://wle.cgiar.org/blogs/2014/05/15/african-smallholder-farm-families-lost-elasticity- bounce-back/ 
 Noor, R.A and Sibanda, L.M. Planting the Seeds for Greater African Harvests. (2014). http://www.huffingtonpost.com/ramadhani-abdallah-noor/planting-the-seeds-for- gr_b_5998678.html

Languages 
English, French, Arabic, Zulu, Shona

References 

21st-century Zimbabwean women politicians
21st-century Zimbabwean politicians
Living people
Alexandria University alumni
Alumni of the University of Reading
Agriculturalists
Nonprofit chief executives
Year of birth missing (living people)
Place of birth missing (living people)